The Moonstone is a television drama series based on the 1868 novel The Moonstone by Wilkie Collins. It was broadcast in two parts in 1996.

Cast

Greg Wise as Franklin Blake
Keeley Hawes as Rachel Verinder
Terrence Hardiman as Col. Sir John Hardcastle
Peter Vaughan as Gabriel Betterege
Patricia Hodge as Lady Julia Verinder
Antony Sher as Sargeant Cuff
Anton Lesser as Ezra Jennings
Paul Brooke as Dr. Candy
Scott Handy as Godfrey Ablewhite
Lesley Sharp as Rosanna Spearman
Kacey Ainsworth as Drusilla Clack
Peter Jeffrey as Mr Bruff

References

External links

1996 British television series debuts
1996 British television series endings
1990s British drama television series
BBC television dramas
Television series set in the 19th century
BBC mystery television shows
Television shows based on British novels
1990s British television miniseries
English-language television shows